Wieland is a Germanic name, from wela, "battle", and nand, "brave". The English form is Wayland.

Weyland the Smith, a smith in Germanic mythology

Given name
Wieland Wagner (1917–1966), grandson of Richard Wagner

Surname
Alon Wieland (1935–2022), American businessman and politician
Christoph Martin Wieland (1733–1813), German poet
Heinrich Otto Wieland (1877–1957),  Nobel Prize–winning German chemist
Jan Müller-Wieland (born 1966), German composer
Joe Wieland (born 1990), American baseball player
Johann Wieland (born 1972), Austrian ski mountaineer
Liza Wieland (born 1960), American novelist
Melchior Wieland (c. 1520–1589), Prussian herbalist
Paul Wieland (born 1962), American politician
Rainer Wieland (born 1957), a German politician

Other
 Wieland (novel), a 1798 novel by Charles Brockden Brown

See also
 Wayland (disambiguation)
 Weyland (disambiguation)
 Weiland (disambiguation)
 Wyland (disambiguation)